Lindsay Davenport and Natasha Zvereva were the defending champions, but Davenport did not compete this year. Zvereva teamed up with Katarina Srebotnik and lost in quarterfinals to Lisa Raymond and Rennae Stubbs.

Martina Hingis and Mary Pierce won the title by defeating Alexandra Fusai and Nathalie Tauziat 6–4, 6–1 in the final.

Seeds

Draw

Draw

References
 Main Draw (WTA)

Toray Pan Pacific Open - Doubles
2000 Doubles
2000 Toray Pan Pacific Open